Bido Bhatti is a small village in near the town of Tanda, in Gujrat District in Punjab province of Pakistan.

It is located about 35  km north east of Gujrat city and about 25 km from the city of Sialkot. It is perched atop a small hillock which overlooks the Marala Headworks at the very juncture where the Chenab River winds its way into Pakistan. The village nearest to Bido Bhatti is Behlol Pur

The village gets its name from the Bhatti Rajputs, who make up the bulk of the population.

References

Union councils of Gujrat District
Populated places in Gujrat District

ur:گجرات